Yeysky District is an administrative district (raion), one of the thirty-eight in Krasnodar Krai, Russia. As a municipal division, it is incorporated as Yeysky Municipal District. It is located in the northwest of the krai. Its administrative center is the town of Yeysk (which is not administratively a part of the district). Population:

Geography
Yeysky District is home to Lake Khanskoye.

Administrative and municipal status
Within the framework of administrative divisions, Yeysky District is one of the thirty-eight in the krai. The town of Yeysk serves as its administrative center, despite being incorporated separately as an administrative unit with the status equal to that of the districts (and which, in addition to Yeysk, also includes seven rural localities).

As a municipal division, the district is incorporated as Yeysky Municipal District, with the Town of Yeysk being incorporated within it as Yeyskoye Urban Settlement.

References

Notes

Sources

Districts of Krasnodar Krai